WCFS-LP (105.9 FM) is a radio station licensed to Du Quoin, Illinois, United States.  The station is owned by Christian Fellowship Church.

References

External links
 

CFS-LP
CFS-LP
Radio stations established in 2005
2005 establishments in Illinois